Van Oldenbarnevelt is a Dutch surname. Notable people with the surname include:

Johan van Oldenbarnevelt (1547–1619), Dutch nobility
Willem van Oldenbarnevelt (1590–before 1638), Dutch nobility
Reinier van Oldenbarnevelt (c.1588–1623), Dutch nobility

Dutch-language surnames